The Legatum Prosperity Index is an annual ranking developed by the Legatum Institute, an independent educational charity founded and part-funded by the private investment firm Legatum. The ranking is based on a variety of factors including wealth, economic growth, education, health, personal well-being, and quality of life. 

As of the 2021 rankings, 167 countries and territories were ranked, and Denmark topped the list, followed by Norway and Sweden. South Sudan was in last place at 167th. In 2013, twenty-seven of the top 30 countries were democracies.

Methodology 

The 2018 Legatum Prosperity Index is based on 104 different variables analysed across 149 nations around the world. Source data includes Gallup World Poll, World Development Indicators, International Telecommunication Union, Fragile States Index, Worldwide Governance Indicators, Freedom House, World Health Organization, World Values Survey, Amnesty International, Centre for Systemic Peace. The 104 variables are grouped into 9 sub-indexes, which are averaged using equal weights. The 9 sub-indexes are:

 Economic Quality
 Business Environment
 Governance
 Education
 Health
 Safety & Security
 Personal Freedom
 Social Capital
 Natural Environment

For example, Personal Freedom includes freedom of speech and religion, national tolerance for immigrants and ethnic and racial minorities.  The Social Capital sub-index includes the percentage of citizens who volunteer, give to charity, help strangers, and who feel they can rely on family and friends.

Oxford Analytica assisted in the early development of the Prosperity Index and has contributed to shaping the methodology. Today, the annual Index is produced and published by the Legatum Institute.

The Legatum Institute operates a transparent approach to its work on the Prosperity Index. To that end, the entire methodology of the Prosperity Index along with the data used to create it is available for free online at the institute's website.

Rankings and scores by country

2021

2020

2019

Legatum Institute 

The Legatum Institute publishes the index.

Personnel 

The Director of the Prosperity Index is Dr. Stephen Brien. The Prosperity Index is reviewed and critiqued by an advisory panel of academics and scholars representing a range of disciplines and includes: Prof Tim Besley (London School of Economics); Dr. Daniel Drezner (Tufts University); Dr. Carol Graham (Brookings Institution); Dr. Edmund Malesky (University of California, San Diego); Dr. Ann Owen (Hamilton College).

The Legatum Institute's International Advisory Group also contributes and assists in the Prosperity Index: Prof Peter Skerry (Boston College); Prof Dan Chirot (University of Washington); Toby Mundy CEO (Atlantic Books); and Patrick Cheung.

See also 

 Bhutan GNH Index
 Broad measures of economic progress
 Democracy Ranking
 Demographic economics
 Economic development
 Gender Development Index
 Genuine Progress Indicator (GPI)
 Global Peace Index
 Gross National Happiness
 Gross National Well-being (GNW)
 Happiness economics
 Happy Planet Index (HPI)
 Human Development and Capability Association
 Human Development Index (HDI)
 Human Poverty Index
 Index of Sustainable Economic Welfare (ISEW)
 International development
 Millennium Development Goals (MDGs)
 Money-rich, time-poor
 OECD Better Life Index BLI
 Psychometrics
 Subjective life satisfaction
 System of National Accounts
 Welfare economics
 Where-to-be-born Index
 World Happiness Report (WHR)
 World Values Survey (WVS)

References

External links 
 

International development
International quality of life rankings